Kwai may refer to:

 Kwai (app), a Chinese video sharing app
 River Kwai (disambiguation), two rivers in Thailand
 Kwai (DC Comics)
 KWAI, radio station

See also
 Kwaio language
 Kwaio people